Yahia Nader Moustafa Elsharif (Arabic:يحيى نادر مصطفى الشريف) (born 11 September 1998) is an Emirati footballer who plays as a midfielder for Al Ain.

Career
Yahia Nader is an Egyptian player born in the United Arab Emirates. He played with Al Ain in juniors and participated in the first team in 2018 after allowing the born in United Arab Emirates to participate in the UAE Pro League. He was granted Emirati citizenship in 2019 and was chosen he was chosen to participate with the Olympic team to participate in 2020 AFC U-23 Championship .

He receives his First International cap with Emirates "A selection" when coming in as substitute of Abdullah Ramadan at the 75th minute of the World Cup 2022 AFC Playoff against Australia in June 2022.

External links

References

1998 births
Emirati footballers
Egyptian footballers
Olympic footballers of the United Arab Emirates
Naturalized citizens of the United Arab Emirates
Emirati people of Egyptian descent
Living people
Al Ain FC players
UAE Pro League players
Association football midfielders
Place of birth missing (living people)